Baryssinus is a genus of beetles in the family Cerambycidae, containing the following species:

 Baryssinus albifrons Monné & Martins, 1976
 Baryssinus bicirrifer Bates, 1872
 Baryssinus bilineatus Bates, 1864
 Baryssinus chemsaki Monné, 1985
 Baryssinus giesberti Monne & Monne, 2007
 Baryssinus huedepohli Monné & Martins, 1976
 Baryssinus marcelae Martins & Monné, 1974
 Baryssinus marisae Martins & Monné, 1974
 Baryssinus melasmus Monné & Martins, 1976
 Baryssinus mimus Monne & Monne, 2007
 Baryssinus modestus Monné, 1985
 Baryssinus penicillatus Bates, 1864
 Baryssinus robertoi Monné & Martins, 1976
 Baryssinus silviae Martins & Monné, 1974

References

 
Acanthocinini